Alcubierre may refer to:

Places
 Alcubierre, Huesca, Aragon, Spain; a municipality
 Sierra de Alcubierre, a mountain range in Spain

People
 Count of Alcubierre, a Grandee of Spain, see List of current Grandees of Spain

 Inocencia Alcubierre (1901-1927) Spanish actress
 Miguel Alcubierre (born 1964) Mexican physicist, discoverer of the Alcubierre metric, inventor of the Alcubierre warp drive theory
 Pedro Latorre Alcubierre, a Spanish colonial governor of Ifni and Spanish Sahara, see List of colonial governors of Ifni
 Roque Joaquín de Alcubierre (1702-1780) Spanish military engineer

See also

 
 Alcubierre drive, a type of relativistically consistent non-Newtonian spacewarp spaceship drive
 Senés de Alcubierre, Huesca, Aragon, Spain

Disambiguation pages